The national emblem of the Abkhaz Autonomous Soviet Socialist Republic was adopted in 1937 by the government of the Abkhaz Autonomous Soviet Socialist Republic. The emblem is identical to the emblem of the Georgian Soviet Socialist Republic.

History 
The first emblem of the Abkhaz ASSR was defined in the Constitution of the Abkhaz ASSR. The constitution was adopted on August 2, 1937 by the 8th All-Abkhaz Congress of Soviets. The emblem was described in the Article 111 of the constitution:

First revision 
In 1938, the Abkhaz writing script switched to the Georgian script. The inscriptions on the emblem also changed accordingly.

Second revision 
In 1954, the Abkhaz writing script switched to the Cyrillic script. The inscriptions on the emblem also changed accordingly.

Third revision 
In accordance with the new Constitution of the Abkhaz ASSR adopted on July 6, 1978, an inscription was added to its coat of arms in two lines “საქ. სსრ” in Georgian (top) and "Аҧ. АССР" in Abkhaz language. The emblem was described in Article 159 of the Constitution :

Gallery

References 

Abkhaz ASSR
History of Abkhazia
Abkhaz ASSR
Abkhaz ASSR
Abkhaz ASSR
Abkhaz ASSR
Georgian SFSR
Abkhaz ASSR
Abkhaz ASSR